Apocalipstick is the second studio album by American indie rock band Cherry Glazerr, released on January 20, 2017. The band worked on the album with producers Joe Chiccarelli and Carlos de la Garza, making their garage sound more polished. This album was said by AllMusic to have a '90s vibe and a sound influenced by indie bands. Frontwoman Clem Creevy joined up with keyboardist Sasami Ashworth and drummer Tabor Allen for the making of their major label debut.

Accolades

Apocalipstick was released to overall critical approval: it was described by Pitchfork as the band's "fiercest recording yet, full of shredding jams, furious howls, and self-aware swagger", and its lead single "I Told You I'd Be With The Guys" as a "tremendous indie rock tune powerful enough to restore your faith in the genre' by The Guardian.

At Metacritic, which assigns a normalized rating out of 100 to reviews from mainstream publications, Apocalipstick received an average score of 76, indicating "generally favorable reviews".

Track listing

References 

2017 albums
Cherry Glazerr albums
Secretly Canadian albums
Albums produced by Carlos de la Garza (music producer)
Albums produced by Joe Chiccarelli